Barwon River  may refer to:
 Barwon River (New South Wales), Australia
 Barwon River (Victoria), Australia